Provincial Road 547 (PR 547) is a very short provincial road in Manitoba, Canada. The main purpose of PR 547 is to serve as a connector spur between PR 482 and Highway 381, which along with Highway 8 serves the border village of MacNutt.

References

External links 
Manitoba Official Map - West Central

547